The technological singularity—or simply the singularity—is a hypothetical future point in time at which technological growth becomes uncontrollable and irreversible, resulting in unforeseeable changes to human civilization. According to the most popular version of the singularity hypothesis, I.J. Good's intelligence explosion model, an upgradable intelligent agent will eventually enter a "runaway reaction" of self-improvement cycles, each new and more intelligent generation appearing more and more rapidly, causing an "explosion" in intelligence and resulting in a powerful superintelligence that qualitatively far surpasses all human intelligence.

The first person to use the concept of a "singularity" in the technological context was John von Neumann. Stanislaw Ulam reports a 1958 discussion with von Neumann "centered on the accelerating progress of technology and changes in the mode of human life, which gives the appearance of approaching some essential singularity in the history of the race beyond which human affairs, as we know them, could not continue". Subsequent authors have echoed this viewpoint.

The concept and the term "singularity" were popularized by Vernor Vinge first in 1983 in an article that claimed that once humans create intelligences greater than their own, there will be a technological and social transition similar in some sense to "the knotted space-time at the center of a black hole", and later in his 1993 essay The Coming Technological Singularity, in which he wrote that it would signal the end of the human era, as the new superintelligence would continue to upgrade itself and would advance technologically at an incomprehensible rate. He wrote that he would be surprised if it occurred before 2005 or after 2030. Another significant contributor to wider circulation of the notion was Ray Kurzweil's 2005 book The Singularity is Near, predicting singularity by 2045.

Some scientists, including Stephen Hawking, have expressed concern that artificial superintelligence (ASI) could result in human extinction. The consequences of the singularity and its potential benefit or harm to the human race have been intensely debated.

Prominent technologists and academics dispute the plausibility of a technological singularity and the associated artificial intelligence explosion, including Paul Allen, Jeff Hawkins, John Holland, Jaron Lanier, Steven Pinker, Theodore Modis, and Gordon Moore. One claim made was that the artificial intelligence growth is likely to run into decreasing returns instead of accelerating ones, as was observed in previously developed human technologies.

Intelligence explosion 
Although technological progress has been accelerating in most areas, it has been limited by the basic intelligence of the human brain, which has not, according to Paul R. Ehrlich, changed significantly for millennia. However, with the increasing power of computers and other technologies, it might eventually be possible to build a machine that is significantly more intelligent than humans.

If a superhuman intelligence were to be invented—either through the amplification of human intelligence or through artificial intelligence—it would vastly improve over human problem-solving and inventive skills. Such an AI is referred to as Seed AI because if an AI were created with engineering capabilities that matched or surpassed those of its human creators, it would have the potential to autonomously improve its own software and hardware to design an even more capable machine, which could repeat the process in turn. This recursive self-improvement could accelerate, potentially allowing enormous qualitative change before any upper limits imposed by the laws of physics or theoretical computation set in. It is speculated that over many iterations, such an AI would far surpass human cognitive abilities.

I. J. Good speculated in 1965 that artificial general intelligence might bring about an intelligence explosion:

One version of intelligence explosion is one where computing power approaches infinity in a finite amount of time. In this version, once AIs are doing the research to improve themselves, speed doubles e.g. after 2 years, then 1 year, then 6 months, then 3 months, then 1.5 months, etc., where the infinite sum of the doubling periods is 4 years. Unless prevented by physical limits of computation and time quantization, this process would literally achieve infinite computing power in 4 years, properly earning the name "singularity" for the final state. This form of intelligence explosion is described in Yudkowsky (1996).

Emergence of superintelligence

A superintelligence, hyperintelligence, or superhuman intelligence is a hypothetical agent that possesses intelligence far surpassing that of the brightest and most gifted human minds. "Superintelligence" may also refer to the form or degree of intelligence possessed by such an agent. John von Neumann, Vernor Vinge and Ray Kurzweil define the concept in terms of the technological creation of super intelligence, arguing that it is difficult or impossible for present-day humans to predict what human beings' lives would be like in a post-singularity world.

Technology forecasters and researchers disagree regarding when, or whether, human intelligence will likely be surpassed. Some argue that advances in artificial intelligence (AI) will probably result in general reasoning systems that bypass human cognitive limitations. Others believe that humans will evolve or directly modify their biology so as to achieve radically greater intelligence. A number of futures studies scenarios combine these possibilities, suggesting that humans are likely to interface with computers, or upload their minds to computers, in a way that enables substantial intelligence amplification. The book The Age of Em by Robin Hanson describes a hypothetical future scenario in which human brains are scanned and digitized, creating "uploads" or digital versions of human consciousness. In this future, the development of these uploads may precede or coincide with the emergence of superintelligent artificial intelligence.

Non-AI singularity
Some writers use "the singularity" in a broader way to refer to any radical changes in society brought about by new technologies such as molecular nanotechnology, although Vinge and other writers specifically state that without superintelligence, such changes would not qualify as a true singularity.

Speed superintelligence
A speed superintelligence describes an AI that can function like a human mind, only much faster. For example, with a million-fold increase in the speed of information processing relative to that of humans, a subjective year would pass in 30 physical seconds. Such a difference in information processing speed could drive the singularity.

Predictions
As per Chalmers, "Good (1965) predicts an ultraintelligent machine by 2000, Vinge (1993) predicts greater-than-human intelligence between 2005 and 2030, Yudkowsky (1996) predicts a singularity by 2021, and Kurzweil (2005) predicts human-level artificial intelligence by 2030." Moravec (1988) predicts human-level artificial intelligence in supercomputers by 2010 by extrapolating past trend using a chart, while Moravec (1998/1999) predicts human-level artificial intelligence by 2040, and intelligence far beyond human by 2050. Per 2017 interview, Kurzweil predicts human-level intelligence by 2029 and billion fold intelligence and singularity by 2045.

Four polls of AI researchers, conducted in 2012 and 2013 by Nick Bostrom and Vincent C. Müller, suggested a confidence of 50% that artificial general intelligence (AGI) would be developed by 2040–2050.

Plausibility
Prominent technologists and academics dispute the plausibility of a technological singularity, including Paul Allen, Jeff Hawkins, John Holland, Jaron Lanier, Steven Pinker, Theodore Modis, and Gordon Moore, whose law is often cited in support of the concept.

Most proposed methods for creating superhuman or transhuman minds fall into one of two categories: intelligence amplification of human brains and artificial intelligence. The many speculated ways to augment human intelligence include bioengineering, genetic engineering, nootropic drugs, AI assistants, direct brain–computer interfaces and mind uploading. These multiple possible paths to an intelligence explosion, all of which will presumably be pursued, makes a singularity more likely.

Robin Hanson expressed skepticism of human intelligence augmentation, writing that once the "low-hanging fruit" of easy methods for increasing human intelligence have been exhausted, further improvements will become increasingly difficult. Despite all of the speculated ways for amplifying human intelligence, non-human artificial intelligence (specifically seed AI) is the most popular option among the hypotheses that would advance the singularity.

The possibility of an intelligence explosion depends on three factors. The first accelerating factor is the new intelligence enhancements made possible by each previous improvement. Contrariwise, as the intelligences become more advanced, further advances will become more and more complicated, possibly outweighing the advantage of increased intelligence. Each improvement should generate at least one more improvement, on average, for movement towards singularity to continue. Finally, the laws of physics may eventually prevent further improvement.

There are two logically independent, but mutually reinforcing, causes of intelligence improvements: increases in the speed of computation, and improvements to the algorithms used. The former is predicted by Moore's Law and the forecasted improvements in hardware, and is comparatively similar to previous technological advances. But there are some AI researchers, who believe software is more important than hardware.

A 2017 email survey of authors with publications at the 2015 NeurIPS and ICML machine learning conferences asked about the chance that "the intelligence explosion argument is broadly correct". Of the respondents, 12% said it was "quite likely", 17% said it was "likely", 21% said it was "about even", 24% said it was "unlikely" and 26% said it was "quite unlikely".

Speed improvements 
Both for human and artificial intelligence, hardware improvements increase the rate of future hardware improvements. An analogy to Moore's Law suggests that if the first doubling of speed took 18 months, the second would take 18 subjective months; or 9 external months, whereafter, four months, two months, and so on towards a speed singularity. Some upper limit on speed may eventually be reached. Jeff Hawkins has stated that a self-improving computer system would inevitably run into upper limits on computing power: "in the end there are limits to how big and fast computers can run. We would end up in the same place; we'd just get there a bit faster. There would be no singularity."

It is difficult to directly compare silicon-based hardware with neurons. But  notes that computer speech recognition is approaching human capabilities, and that this capability seems to require 0.01% of the volume of the brain. This analogy suggests that modern computer hardware is within a few orders of magnitude of being as powerful as the human brain.

Exponential growth

The exponential growth in computing technology suggested by Moore's law is commonly cited as a reason to expect a singularity in the relatively near future, and a number of authors have proposed generalizations of Moore's law. Computer scientist and futurist Hans Moravec proposed in a 1998 book that the exponential growth curve could be extended back through earlier computing technologies prior to the integrated circuit.

Ray Kurzweil postulates a law of accelerating returns in which the speed of technological change (and more generally, all evolutionary processes) increases exponentially, generalizing Moore's law in the same manner as Moravec's proposal, and also including material technology (especially as applied to nanotechnology), medical technology and others. Between 1986 and 2007, machines' application-specific capacity to compute information per capita roughly doubled every 14 months; the per capita capacity of the world's general-purpose computers has doubled every 18 months; the global telecommunication capacity per capita doubled every 34 months; and the world's storage capacity per capita doubled every 40 months. On the other hand, it has been argued that the global acceleration pattern having the 21st century singularity as its parameter should be characterized as hyperbolic rather than exponential.

Kurzweil reserves the term "singularity" for a rapid increase in artificial intelligence (as opposed to other technologies), writing for example that "The Singularity will allow us to transcend these limitations of our biological bodies and brains ... There will be no distinction, post-Singularity, between human and machine". He also defines his predicted date of the singularity (2045) in terms of when he expects computer-based intelligences to significantly exceed the sum total of human brainpower, writing that advances in computing before that date "will not represent the Singularity" because they do "not yet correspond to a profound expansion of our intelligence."

Accelerating change

Some singularity proponents argue its inevitability through extrapolation of past trends, especially those pertaining to shortening gaps between improvements to technology. In one of the first uses of the term "singularity" in the context of technological progress, Stanislaw Ulam tells of a conversation with John von Neumann about accelerating change: 

Kurzweil claims that technological progress follows a pattern of exponential growth, following what he calls the "law of accelerating returns". Whenever technology approaches a barrier, Kurzweil writes, new technologies will surmount it. He predicts paradigm shifts will become increasingly common, leading to "technological change so rapid and profound it represents a rupture in the fabric of human history". Kurzweil believes that the singularity will occur by approximately 2045. His predictions differ from Vinge's in that he predicts a gradual ascent to the singularity, rather than Vinge's rapidly self-improving superhuman intelligence.

Oft-cited dangers include those commonly associated with molecular nanotechnology and genetic engineering. These threats are major issues for both singularity advocates and critics, and were the subject of Bill Joy's April 2000 Wired magazine article "Why The Future Doesn't Need Us".

Algorithm improvements 
Some intelligence technologies, like "seed AI", may also have the potential to not just make themselves faster, but also more efficient, by modifying their source code. These improvements would make further improvements possible, which would make further improvements possible, and so on.

The mechanism for a recursively self-improving set of algorithms differs from an increase in raw computation speed in two ways. First, it does not require external influence: machines designing faster hardware would still require humans to create the improved hardware, or to program factories appropriately. An AI rewriting its own source code could do so while contained in an AI box.

Second, as with Vernor Vinge’s conception of the singularity, it is much harder to predict the outcome. While speed increases seem to be only a quantitative difference from human intelligence, actual algorithm improvements would be qualitatively different. Eliezer Yudkowsky compares it to the changes that human intelligence brought: humans changed the world thousands of times more rapidly than evolution had done, and in totally different ways. Similarly, the evolution of life was a massive departure and acceleration from the previous geological rates of change, and improved intelligence could cause change to be as different again.

There are substantial dangers associated with an intelligence explosion singularity originating from a recursively self-improving set of algorithms. First, the goal structure of the AI might self-modify, potentially causing the AI to optimise for something other than what was originally intended.

Secondly, AIs could compete for the same scarce resources humankind uses to survive. While not actively malicious, AIs would promote the goals of their programming, not necessarily broader human goals, and thus might crowd out humans completely.

Carl Shulman and Anders Sandberg suggest that algorithm improvements may be the limiting factor for a singularity; while hardware efficiency tends to improve at a steady pace, software innovations are more unpredictable and may be bottlenecked by serial, cumulative research. They suggest that in the case of a software-limited singularity, intelligence explosion would actually become more likely than with a hardware-limited singularity, because in the software-limited case, once human-level AI is developed, it could run serially on very fast hardware, and the abundance of cheap hardware would make AI research less constrained. An abundance of accumulated hardware that can be unleashed once the software figures out how to use it has been called "computing overhang."

Criticism
Some critics, like philosopher Hubert Dreyfus and philosopher John Searle, assert that computers or machines cannot achieve human intelligence. Others, like physicist Stephen Hawking, object that whether machines can achieve a true intelligence or merely something similar to intelligence is irrelevant if the net result is the same.

Psychologist Steven Pinker stated in 2008: "There is not the slightest reason to believe in a coming singularity. The fact that you can visualize a future in your imagination is not evidence that it is likely or even possible. Look at domed cities, jet-pack commuting, underwater cities, mile-high buildings, and nuclear-powered automobiles—all staples of futuristic fantasies when I was a child that have never arrived. Sheer processing power is not a pixie dust that magically solves all your problems. ..."

Martin Ford postulates a "technology paradox" in that before the singularity could occur most routine jobs in the economy would be automated, since this would require a level of technology inferior to that of the singularity. This would cause massive unemployment and plummeting consumer demand, which in turn would destroy the incentive to invest in the technologies that would be required to bring about the Singularity. Job displacement is increasingly no longer limited to those types of work traditionally considered to be "routine."

Theodore Modis and Jonathan Huebner argue that the rate of technological innovation has not only ceased to rise, but is actually now declining. Evidence for this decline is that the rise in computer clock rates is slowing, even while Moore's prediction of exponentially increasing circuit density continues to hold. This is due to excessive heat build-up from the chip, which cannot be dissipated quickly enough to prevent the chip from melting when operating at higher speeds. Advances in speed may be possible in the future by virtue of more power-efficient CPU designs and multi-cell processors.

Theodore Modis holds the singularity cannot happen. He claims the "technological singularity" and especially Kurzweil lack scientific rigor; Kurzweil is alleged to mistake the logistic function (S-function) for an exponential function, and to see a "knee" in an exponential function where there can in fact be no such thing. In a 2021 article, Modis pointed out that no milestones – breaks in historical perspective comparable in importance to the Internet, DNA, the transistor, or nuclear energy – had been observed in the previous twenty years while five of them would have been expected according to the exponential trend advocated by the proponents of the technological singularity.

AI researcher Jürgen Schmidhuber stated that the frequency of subjectively "notable events" appears to be approaching a 21st-century singularity, but cautioned readers to take such plots of subjective events with a grain of salt: perhaps differences in memory of recent and distant events could create an illusion of accelerating change where none exists.

Microsoft co-founder Paul Allen argued the opposite of accelerating returns, the complexity brake; the more progress science makes towards understanding intelligence, the more difficult it becomes to make additional progress.  A study of the number of patents shows that human creativity does not show accelerating returns, but in fact, as suggested by Joseph Tainter in his The Collapse of Complex Societies, a law of diminishing returns. The number of patents per thousand peaked in the period from 1850 to 1900, and has been declining since. The growth of complexity eventually becomes self-limiting, and leads to a widespread "general systems collapse".

Hofstadter (2006) raises concern that Ray Kurzweil is not sufficiently scientifically rigorous, that an exponential tendency of technology is not a scientific law like one of physics, and that exponential curves have no "knees". Nonetheless, he does not rule out the singularity in principle in the distant future.

Jaron Lanier denies that the singularity is inevitable: "I do not think the technology is creating itself. It's not an autonomous process." Furthermore: "The reason to believe in human agency over technological determinism is that you can then have an economy where people earn their own way and invent their own lives. If you structure a society on not emphasizing individual human agency, it's the same thing operationally as denying people clout, dignity, and self-determination ... to embrace [the idea of the Singularity] would be a celebration of bad data and bad politics."

Economist Robert J. Gordon points out that measured economic growth has slowed around 1970 and slowed even further since the financial crisis of 2007–2008, and argues that the economic data show no trace of a coming Singularity as imagined by mathematician I. J. Good.

Philosopher and cognitive scientist Daniel Dennett said in 2017: "The whole singularity stuff, that’s preposterous. It distracts us from much more pressing problems", adding "AI tools that we become hyper-dependent on, that is going to happen. And one of the dangers is that we will give them more authority than they warrant."

In addition to general criticisms of the singularity concept, several critics have raised issues with Kurzweil's iconic chart. One line of criticism is that a log-log chart of this nature is inherently biased toward a straight-line result. Others identify selection bias in the points that Kurzweil chooses to use. For example, biologist PZ Myers points out that many of the early evolutionary "events" were picked arbitrarily. Kurzweil has rebutted this by charting evolutionary events from 15 neutral sources, and showing that they fit a straight line on a log-log chart. Kelly (2006) argues that the way the Kurzweil chart is constructed with x-axis having time before present, it always points to the singularity being "now", for any date on which one would construct such a chart, and shows this visually on Kurzweil's chart.

Some critics suggest religious motivations or implications of singularity, especially Kurzweil's version of it. The buildup towards the Singularity is compared with Judeo-Christian end-of-time scenarios. Beam calls it "a Buck Rogers vision of the hypothetical Christian Rapture". John Gray says "the Singularity echoes apocalyptic myths in which history is about to be interrupted by a world-transforming event".

Potential impacts
Dramatic changes in the rate of economic growth have occurred in the past because of technological advancement. Based on population growth, the economy doubled every 250,000 years from the Paleolithic era until the Neolithic Revolution. The new agricultural economy doubled every 900 years, a remarkable increase. In the current era, beginning with the Industrial Revolution, the world's economic output doubles every fifteen years, sixty times faster than during the agricultural era. If the rise of superhuman intelligence causes a similar revolution, argues Robin Hanson, one would expect the economy to double at least quarterly and possibly on a weekly basis.

Uncertainty and risk

The term "technological singularity" reflects the idea that such change may happen suddenly, and that it is difficult to predict how the resulting new world would operate. It is unclear whether an intelligence explosion resulting in a singularity would be beneficial or harmful, or even an existential threat. Because AI is a major factor in singularity risk, a number of organizations pursue a technical theory of aligning AI goal-systems with human values, including the Future of Humanity Institute, the Machine Intelligence Research Institute, the Center for Human-Compatible Artificial Intelligence, and the Future of Life Institute.

Physicist Stephen Hawking said in 2014 that "Success in creating AI would be the biggest event in human history. Unfortunately, it might also be the last, unless we learn how to avoid the risks." Hawking believed that in the coming decades, AI could offer "incalculable benefits and risks" such as "technology outsmarting financial markets, out-inventing human researchers, out-manipulating human leaders, and developing weapons we cannot even understand." Hawking suggested that artificial intelligence should be taken more seriously and that more should be done to prepare for the singularity:

 claims that there is no direct evolutionary motivation for an AI to be friendly to humans. Evolution has no inherent tendency to produce outcomes valued by humans, and there is little reason to expect an arbitrary optimisation process to promote an outcome desired by humankind, rather than inadvertently leading to an AI behaving in a way not intended by its creators. Anders Sandberg has also elaborated on this scenario, addressing various common counter-arguments. AI researcher Hugo de Garis suggests that artificial intelligences may simply eliminate the human race for access to scarce resources, and humans would be powerless to stop them. Alternatively, AIs developed under evolutionary pressure to promote their own survival could outcompete humanity.

 discusses human extinction scenarios, and lists superintelligence as a possible cause:

According to Eliezer Yudkowsky, a significant problem in AI safety is that unfriendly artificial intelligence is likely to be much easier to create than friendly AI. While both require large advances in recursive optimisation process design, friendly AI also requires the ability to make goal structures invariant under self-improvement (or the AI could transform itself into something unfriendly) and a goal structure that aligns with human values and does not automatically destroy the human race. An unfriendly AI, on the other hand, can optimize for an arbitrary goal structure, which does not need to be invariant under self-modification.  proposes an AI design that avoids several dangers including self-delusion, unintended instrumental actions, and corruption of the reward generator. He also discusses social impacts of AI and testing AI. His 2001 book Super-Intelligent Machines advocates the need for public education about AI and public control over AI. It also proposed a simple design that was vulnerable to corruption of the reward generator.

Next step of sociobiological evolution

While the technological singularity is usually seen as a sudden event, some scholars argue the current speed of change already fits this description.

In addition, some argue that we are already in the midst of a major evolutionary transition that merges technology, biology, and society. Digital technology has infiltrated the fabric of human society to a degree of indisputable and often life-sustaining dependence.

A 2016 article in Trends in Ecology & Evolution argues that "humans already embrace fusions of biology and technology. We spend most of our waking time communicating through digitally mediated channels... we trust artificial intelligence with our lives through antilock braking in cars and autopilots in planes... With one in three marriages in America beginning online, digital algorithms are also taking a role in human pair bonding and reproduction".

The article further argues that from the perspective of the evolution, several previous Major Transitions in Evolution have transformed life through innovations in information storage and replication (RNA, DNA, multicellularity, and culture and language). In the current stage of life's evolution, the carbon-based biosphere has generated a cognitive system (humans) capable of creating technology that will result in a comparable evolutionary transition.

The digital information created by humans has reached a similar magnitude to biological information in the biosphere. Since the 1980s, the quantity of digital information stored has doubled about every 2.5 years, reaching about 5 zettabytes in 2014 (5 bytes).

In biological terms, there are 7.2 billion humans on the planet, each having a genome of 6.2 billion nucleotides. Since one byte can encode four nucleotide pairs, the individual genomes of every human on the planet could be encoded by approximately 1 bytes. The digital realm stored 500 times more information than this in 2014 (see figure). The total amount of DNA contained in all of the cells on Earth is estimated to be about 5.3 base pairs, equivalent to 1.325 bytes of information.

If growth in digital storage continues at its current rate of 30–38% compound annual growth per year, it will rival the total information content contained in all of the DNA in all of the cells on Earth in about 110 years. This would represent a doubling of the amount of information stored in the biosphere across a total time period of just 150 years".

Implications for human society

In February 2009, under the auspices of the Association for the Advancement of Artificial Intelligence (AAAI), Eric Horvitz chaired a meeting of leading computer scientists, artificial intelligence researchers and roboticists at Asilomar in Pacific Grove, California. The goal was to discuss the potential impact of the hypothetical possibility that robots could become self-sufficient and able to make their own decisions. They discussed the extent to which computers and robots might be able to acquire autonomy, and to what degree they could use such abilities to pose threats or hazards.

Some machines are programmed with various forms of semi-autonomy, including the ability to locate their own power sources and choose targets to attack with weapons. Also, some computer viruses can evade elimination and, according to scientists in attendance, could therefore be said to have reached a "cockroach" stage of machine intelligence. The conference attendees noted that self-awareness as depicted in science-fiction is probably unlikely, but that other potential hazards and pitfalls exist.

Frank S. Robinson predicts that once humans achieve a machine with the intelligence of a human, scientific and technological problems will be tackled and solved with brainpower far superior to that of humans. He notes that artificial systems are able to share data more directly than humans, and predicts that this would result in a global network of super-intelligence that would dwarf human capability. Robinson also discusses how vastly different the future would potentially look after such an intelligence explosion. One example of this is solar energy, where the Earth receives vastly more solar energy than humanity captures, so capturing more of that solar energy would hold vast promise for civilizational growth.

Hard vs. soft takeoff

In a hard takeoff scenario, an AGI rapidly self-improves, "taking control" of the world (perhaps in a matter of hours), too quickly for significant human-initiated error correction or for a gradual tuning of the AGI's goals. In a soft takeoff scenario, AGI still becomes far more powerful than humanity, but at a human-like pace (perhaps on the order of decades), on a timescale where ongoing human interaction and correction can effectively steer the AGI's development.

Ramez Naam argues against a hard takeoff. He has pointed out that we already see recursive self-improvement by superintelligences, such as corporations. Intel, for example, has "the collective brainpower of tens of thousands of humans and probably millions of CPU cores to... design better CPUs!" However, this has not led to a hard takeoff; rather, it has led to a soft takeoff in the form of Moore's law. Naam further points out that the computational complexity of higher intelligence may be much greater than linear, such that "creating a mind of intelligence 2 is probably more than twice as hard as creating a mind of intelligence 1."

J. Storrs Hall believes that "many of the more commonly seen scenarios for overnight hard takeoff are circular – they seem to assume hyperhuman capabilities at the starting point of the self-improvement process" in order for an AI to be able to make the dramatic, domain-general improvements required for takeoff. Hall suggests that rather than recursively self-improving its hardware, software, and infrastructure all on its own, a fledgling AI would be better off specializing in one area where it was most effective and then buying the remaining components on the marketplace, because the quality of products on the marketplace continually improves, and the AI would have a hard time keeping up with the cutting-edge technology used by the rest of the world.

Ben Goertzel agrees with Hall's suggestion that a new human-level AI would do well to use its intelligence to accumulate wealth. The AI's talents might inspire companies and governments to disperse its software throughout society. Goertzel is skeptical of a hard five minute takeoff but speculates that a takeoff from human to superhuman level on the order of five years is reasonable. Goerzel refers to this scenario as a "semihard takeoff".

Max More disagrees, arguing that if there were only a few superfast human-level AIs, that they would not radically change the world, as they would still depend on other people to get things done and would still have human cognitive constraints. Even if all superfast AIs worked on intelligence augmentation, it is unclear why they would do better in a discontinuous way than existing human cognitive scientists at producing super-human intelligence, although the rate of progress would increase. More further argues that a superintelligence would not transform the world overnight: a superintelligence would need to engage with existing, slow human systems to accomplish physical impacts on the world. "The need for collaboration, for organization, and for putting ideas into physical changes will ensure that all the old rules are not thrown out overnight or even within years."

Immortality 
Drexler (1986), one of the founders of nanotechnology, postulates cell repair devices, including ones operating within cells and utilizing as yet hypothetical biological machines. According to Richard Feynman, it was his former graduate student and collaborator Albert Hibbs who originally suggested to him (circa 1959) the idea of a medical use for Feynman's theoretical micromachines. Hibbs suggested that certain repair machines might one day be reduced in size to the point that it would, in theory, be possible to (as Feynman put it) "swallow the doctor". The idea was incorporated into Feynman's 1959 essay There's Plenty of Room at the Bottom.

Moravec (1988) predicts possibility of "uploading" human mind into a human-like robot, achieving quasi-immortality by extreme longevity via transfer of the human mind between successive new robots and the old ones wear out; beyond that, he predicts later exponential acceleration of subjective experience of time leading to subjective sense of immortality.

Kurzweil (2005) suggests that medical advances would allow people to protect their bodies from the effects of aging, making the life expectancy limitless. Kurzweil argues that the technological advances in medicine would allow us to continuously repair and replace defective components in our bodies, prolonging life to an undetermined age. Kurzweil further buttresses his argument by discussing current bio-engineering advances. Kurzweil suggests somatic gene therapy; after synthetic viruses with specific genetic information, the next step would be to apply this technology to gene therapy, replacing human DNA with synthesized genes.

Beyond merely extending the operational life of the physical body, Jaron Lanier argues for a form of immortality called "Digital Ascension" that involves "people dying in the flesh and being uploaded into a computer and remaining conscious."

History of the concept
A paper by Mahendra Prasad, published in AI Magazine, asserts that the 18th-century mathematician Marquis de Condorcet was the first person to hypothesize and mathematically model an intelligence explosion and its effects on humanity.

An early description of the idea was made in John W. Campbell's 1932 short story "The last evolution".

In his 1958 obituary for John von Neumann, Ulam recalled a conversation with von Neumann about the "ever accelerating progress of technology and changes in the mode of human life, which gives the appearance of approaching some essential singularity in the history of the race beyond which human affairs, as we know them, could not continue."

In 1965, Good wrote his essay postulating an "intelligence explosion" of recursive self-improvement of a machine intelligence.

In 1977, Hans Moravec wrote an article with unclear publishing status where he envisioned a development of self-improving thinking machines, a creation of "super-consciousness, the synthesis of terrestrial life, and perhaps jovian and martian life as well, constantly improving and extending itself, spreading outwards from the solar system, converting non-life into mind." The article describes the human mind uploading later covered in Moravec (1988). The machines are going to reach human level and then improve themselves beyond that ("Most significantly of all, they [the machines] can be put to work as programmers and engineers, with the task of optimizing the software and hardware which make them what they are. The successive generations of machines produced this way will be increasingly smarter and more cost effective.") Humans will no longer be needed, and will be overtaken by the machines: "In the long run the sheer physical inability of humans to keep up with these rapidly evolving progeny of our minds will ensure that the ratio of people to machines approaches zero, and that a direct descendant of our culture, but not our genes, inherits the universe." While the word "singularity" is not used, the notion of human-level thinking machines thereafter improving themselves beyond human level is there. There is no intelligence explosion in the sense of a very rapid intelligence increase once human equivalence is reached. An updated version of the article was published in 1979 in Analog Science Fiction and Fact.

In 1981, Stanisław Lem published his science fiction novel Golem XIV. It describes a military AI computer (Golem XIV) who obtains consciousness and starts to increase his own intelligence, moving towards personal technological singularity. Golem XIV was originally created to aid its builders in fighting wars, but as its intelligence advances to a much higher level than that of humans, it stops being interested in the military requirements because it finds them lacking internal logical consistency.

In 1983, Vernor Vinge addressed Good's intelligence explosion in print in the January 1983 issue of Omni magazine. In this op-ed piece, Vinge seems to have been the first to use the term "singularity" (although not "technological singularity") in a way that was specifically tied to the creation of intelligent machines:

In 1985, in "The Time Scale of Artificial Intelligence", artificial intelligence researcher Ray Solomonoff articulated mathematically the related notion of what he called an "infinity point": if a research community of human-level self-improving AIs take four years to double their own speed, then two years, then one year and so on, their capabilities increase infinitely in finite time.

In 1986, Vernor Vinge published Marooned in Realtime, a science-fiction novel where a few remaining humans traveling forward in the future have survived an unknown extinction event that might well be a singularity. In a short afterword, the author states that an actual technological singularity would not be the end of the human species: "of course it seems very unlikely that the Singularity would be a clean vanishing of the human race. (On the other hand, such a vanishing is the timelike analog of the silence we find all across the sky.)".

In 1988, Vinge used the phrase "technological singularity" (including "technological") in the short story collection Threats and Other Promises, writing in the introduction to his story "The Whirligig of Time" (p. 72): Barring a worldwide catastrophe, I believe that technology will achieve our wildest dreams, and soon. When we raise our own intelligence and that of our creations, we are no longer in a world of human-sized characters. At that point we have fallen into a technological "black hole," a technological singularity.

In 1988, Hans Moravec published Mind Children, in which he predicted human-level intelligence in supercomputers by 2010, self-improving intelligent machines far surpassing human intelligence later, human mind uploading into human-like robots later, intelligent machines leaving humans behind, and space colonization. He did not mention "singularity", though, and he did not speak of a rapid explosion of intelligence immediately after the human level is achieved. Nonetheless, the overall singularity tenor is there in predicting both human-level artificial intelligence and further artificial intelligence far surpassing humans later.

Vinge's 1993 article "The Coming Technological Singularity: How to Survive in the Post-Human Era", spread widely on the internet and helped to popularize the idea. This article contains the statement, "Within thirty years, we will have the technological means to create superhuman intelligence. Shortly after, the human era will be ended." Vinge argues that science-fiction authors cannot write realistic post-singularity characters who surpass the human intellect, as the thoughts of such an intellect would be beyond the ability of humans to express.

Minsky's 1994 article says robots will "inherit the Earth", possibly with the use of nanotechnology, and proposes to think of robots as human "mind children", drawing the analogy from Moravec. The rhetorical effect of that analogy is that if humans are fine to pass the world to their biological children, they should be equally fine to pass it to robots, their "mind" children. As per Minsky, 'we could design our "mind-children" to think a million times faster than we do. To such a being, half a minute might seem as long as one of our years, and each hour as long as an entire human lifetime.' The feature of the singularity present in Minsky is the development of superhuman artificial intelligence ("million times faster"), but there is no talk of sudden intelligence explosion, self-improving thinking machines or unpredictability beyond any specific event and the word "singularity" is not used.

Tipler's 1994 book The Physics of Immortality predicts future where super–intelligent machines will build enormously powerful computers,  people will be "emulated" in computers, life will reach every galaxy and people will achieve immortality when they reach Omega Point. There is no talk of Vingean "singularity" or sudden intelligence explosion, but intelligence much greater than human is there, as well as immortality.

In 1996, Yudkowsky predicted a singularity by 2021. His version of singularity involves intelligence explosion: once AIs are doing the research to improve themselves, speed doubles after 2 years, then 1 one year, then after 6 months, then after 3 months, then after 1.5 months, and after more iterations, the "singularity" is reached. This construction implies that the speed reaches infinity in finite time.

In 2000, Bill Joy, a prominent technologist and a co-founder of Sun Microsystems, voiced concern over the potential dangers of robotics, genetic engineering, and nanotechnology.

In 2005, Kurzweil published The Singularity Is Near. Kurzweil's publicity campaign included an appearance on The Daily Show with Jon Stewart.

From 2006 to 2012, annual Singularity Summit conference was organized by Machine Intelligence Research Institute, founded by Eliezer Yudkowsky.

In 2007, Eliezer Yudkowsky suggested that many of the varied definitions that have been assigned to "singularity" are mutually incompatible rather than mutually supporting. For example, Kurzweil extrapolates current technological trajectories past the arrival of self-improving AI or superhuman intelligence, which Yudkowsky argues represents a tension with both I. J. Good's proposed discontinuous upswing in intelligence and Vinge's thesis on unpredictability.

In 2009, Kurzweil and X-Prize founder Peter Diamandis announced the establishment of Singularity University, a nonaccredited private institute whose stated mission is "to educate, inspire and empower leaders to apply exponential technologies to address humanity's grand challenges." Funded by Google, Autodesk, ePlanet Ventures, and a group of technology industry leaders, Singularity University is based at NASA's Ames Research Center in Mountain View, California. The not-for-profit organization runs an annual ten-week graduate program during summer that covers ten different technology and allied tracks, and a series of executive programs throughout the year.

In politics
In 2007, the Joint Economic Committee of the United States Congress released a report about the future of nanotechnology. It predicts significant technological and political changes in the mid-term future, including possible technological singularity.

Former President of the United States Barack Obama spoke about singularity in his interview to Wired in 2016:

See also

References

Citations

Sources 

 
 William D. Nordhaus, "Why Growth Will Fall" (a review of Robert J. Gordon, The Rise and Fall of American Growth:  The U.S. Standard of Living Since the Civil War, Princeton University Press, 2016, 762 pp., $39.95), The New York Review of Books, vol. LXIII, no. 13 (August 18, 2016), pp. 64, 66, 68.
 John R. Searle, “What Your Computer Can’t Know” (review of Luciano Floridi, The Fourth Revolution:  How the Infosphere Is Reshaping Human Reality, Oxford University Press, 2014; and Nick Bostrom, Superintelligence:  Paths, Dangers, Strategies, Oxford University Press, 2014), The New York Review of Books, vol. LXI, no. 15 (October 9, 2014), pp. 52–55.

Further reading
 Krüger, Oliver, Virtual Immortality. God, Evolution, and the Singularity in Post- and Transhumanism., Bielefeld: transcript 2021. 
 Marcus, Gary, "Am I Human?:  Researchers need new ways to distinguish artificial intelligence from the natural kind", Scientific American, vol. 316, no. 3 (March 2017), pp. 58–63.  Multiple tests of artificial-intelligence efficacy are needed because, "just as there is no single test of athletic prowess, there cannot be one ultimate test of intelligence."  One such test, a "Construction Challenge", would test perception and physical action—"two important elements of intelligent behavior that were entirely absent from the original Turing test."  Another proposal has been to give machines the same standardized tests of science and other disciplines that schoolchildren take.  A so far insuperable stumbling block to artificial intelligence is an incapacity for reliable disambiguation.  "[V]irtually every sentence [that people generate] is ambiguous, often in multiple ways."  A prominent example is known as the "pronoun disambiguation problem":  a machine has no way of determining to whom or what a pronoun in a sentence—such as "he", "she" or "it"—refers.
 Scaruffi, Piero, "Intelligence is not Artificial" (2016) for a critique of the singularity movement and its similarities to religious cults.

External links 

 singularity | technology, britannica.com
 The Coming Technological Singularity: How to Survive in the Post-Human Era (on Vernor Vinge's web site, retrieved Jul 2019)
 Intelligence Explosion FAQ by the Machine Intelligence Research Institute
 Blog on bootstrapping artificial intelligence by Jacques Pitrat
 Why an Intelligence Explosion is Probable (Mar 2011)
 Why an Intelligence Explosion is Impossible (Nov 2017)
 How Close are We to Technological Singularity and When?

 
Existential risk from artificial general intelligence
Philosophy of artificial intelligence